Events in the year 1900 in Japan.

Incumbents
Emperor: Emperor Meiji
Prime Minister:
Yamagata Aritomo: (until October 19)
Itō Hirobumi: (starting October 19)

Governors
Aichi Prefecture: Mori Mamoru
Akita Prefecture: Takeda Chiyosaburo
Aomori Prefecture: Munakata Tadashi 
Ehime Prefecture: Tai Neijro
Fukui Prefecture: Saburo Iwao then Munakata Tadashi
Fukushima Prefecture: Arita Yoshisuke
Gifu Prefecture: Kawaji Toshikyo
Gunma Prefecture: Furusho Kamon then Nobuchika Ogura
Hiroshima Prefecture: Asada Tokunori
Ibaraki Prefecture: Fumi Kashiwada then Chuzo Kono 
Iwate Prefecture: Ganri Hojo 
Kagawa Prefecture: Yoshihara Saburo then Yoshitaro Arakawa then Naokata Suehiro
Kochi Prefecture: Tadashi Tanigawa then Kinyuu Watanabe 
Kumamoto Prefecture: Tokuhisa Tsunenori 
Kyoto Prefecture: Baron Shoichi Omori
Mie Prefecture: Kamon Furusha
Miyagi Prefecture: Kiyoshi Shin then Chikaaki Takasaki then Nomura Masaaki then Motohiro Onoda 
Miyazaki Prefecture: Sukeo Kabawaya then Isamu Sonowaya 
Nagano Prefecture: Oshikawa Sokkichi 
Niigata Prefecture: Minoru Katsumata 
Oita Prefecture: Marques Okubo Toshi Takeshi then Sada Suzuki
Okinawa Prefecture: Shigeru Narahara
Osaka Prefecture: Tadashini Kikuchi
Saga Prefecture: Seki Kiyohide 
Saitama Prefecture: Marquis Okubo Toshi Takeshi
Shiname Prefecture: Matsunaga Takeyoshi
Tochigi Prefecture: Hagino Samon then Korechika 
Tokyo: Baron Sangay Takatomi
Toyama Prefecture: Kaneoryo Gen
Yamagata Prefecture: Baron Seki Yoshiomi

Events
May 10 – Prince Yoshihito, the future Emperor Taishō, marries Sadako Kujō.
June 5 – Kyoto Hosei School, as predecessor of Ritsumeikan University has founded.

Births
January 1 – Chiune Sugihara, diplomat (d. 1986)
January 16 – Kiku Amino, author and translator (d. 1978)
February 11 – Jōsei Toda, educator and peace activist (d. 1958)
February 27 – Keiji Nishitani, philosopher (d. 1990)
March 15 – Kenji Tomiki, aikido and judo teacher (d. 1979)
July 4 – Ukichiro Nakaya, physicist (d. 1962)
July 5 – Yoshimaro Yamashina, ornithologist (d. 1989)
July 23 – Prince Kaya Tsunenori (d. 1978)
August 4 – Nabi Tajima, supercentenarian (d. 2018)
August 23 – Tatsuji Miyoshi, poet, literary critic, and editor (d. 1964)

Deaths
February 26 – Shinagawa Yajirō, politician (b. 1843)
August 23 – Kuroda Kiyotaka, second Prime Minister of Japan (b. 1840)

References

 
1900s in Japan
Japan
Years of the 19th century in Japan